Colchester—Musquodoboit Valley  is a provincial electoral district in  Nova Scotia, Canada, that elects one member of the Nova Scotia House of Assembly.

The district was created in 1978 from Colchester, and was called Colchester South until 1993. In 1993, the name was changed to Colchester-Musquodoboit Valley and it gained the Salmon River and Musquodoboit Valley areas from Bedford-Musquodoboit Valley, and Millbrook 27 from Truro-Bible Hill. It includes the southern half of Colchester County (not including the Truro area) plus the Musquodoboit Valley region of the Halifax Regional Municipality.

Geography

Members of the Legislative Assembly
This riding has elected the following Members of the Legislative Assembly:

Election results

1978 general election

1981 general election

1984 general election

1988 general election

1993 general election

1998 general election

1999 general election

2003 general election

2006 general election

2009 general election

2013 general election 

|-
 
|Progressive Conservative
|Larry Harrison 
|align="right"|3,304 
|align="right"|42.27
|align="right"|+13.28
|-
 
|New Democratic Party
|Gary Burrill
|align="right"|2,293 
|align="right"|29.33 
|align="right"|-18.76
|-
 
|Liberal
| Tom Martin
|align="right"|2,220 
|align="right"|28.40 
|align="right"|+7.79
|}

2017 general election

2021 general election

References

Election Summary From 1867 - 2007
1993 Poll by Poll Results
1988 Poll by Poll Results
1984 Poll by Poll Results
1981 Poll by Poll Results
1978 Poll by Poll Results

External links
riding profile
June 13, 2006 Nova Scotia Provincial General Election Poll by Poll Results

Nova Scotia provincial electoral districts